A tourniquet test (also known as a Rumpel-Leede capillary-fragility test or simply a capillary fragility test) determines capillary fragility. It is a clinical diagnostic method to determine a patient's haemorrhagic tendency. It assesses fragility of capillary walls and is used to identify thrombocytopenia (a reduced platelet count).

The test is part of the WHO algorithm for diagnosis of dengue fever. A blood pressure cuff is applied and inflated to the midpoint between the systolic and diastolic blood pressures for five minutes. The test is positive if there are more than 10 to 20 petechiae per square inch.

Limitations 
Some studies have shown that the tourniquet test may not have high specificity. Interfering factors with this test are women who are premenstrual, postmenstrual and not taking hormones, or those with sun damaged skin, since all will have increased capillary fragility. However many other studies have shown that the tourniquet test has good specificity but a low sensitivity. Therefore, its use as a diagnostic test for dengue is questioned as people who have a negative test may still have dengue. It is no longer used as a classification test for dengue haemorraghic fever in the latest WHO guidance.

See also
 Hess test

References 

Physical examination